Daniel Owen Woolgar Jarvis  (born 30 November 1972) is a British Labour Party politician and former British Army officer who has served as the Member of Parliament (MP) for Barnsley Central since 2011. He also served as the Mayor of South Yorkshire (formerly Mayor of the Sheffield City Region) from 2018 to 2022 and was a member of the Parachute Regiment from 1997 to 2011.

Early life
Daniel Owen Woolgar Jarvis was born in Nottingham on 30 November 1972, the son of a lecturer at a teacher-training college and a probation officer, both Labour Party members. He attended Lady Bay Primary School and then went on to study at Rushcliffe School.

He studied international politics at what was then the University of Wales, Aberystwyth. He graduated in 1996, with a Bachelor of Arts degree in international politics and strategic studies. He graduated with an MA in conflict, security and development from King's College, London, in 2011.

Military career
Jarvis was commissioned from the Royal Military Academy Sandhurst on 9 August 1997 into the 1st Battalion, Parachute Regiment. He was promoted to captain on 10 October 2001 and to major on 31 July 2003. In the later part of his army career he was stationed at HQ Land Forces in Wilton and lived in Salisbury.

In 1999 Jarvis was a platoon commander with the 3rd Battalion, Parachute Regiment in Kosovo and was with Gen. Sir Mike Jackson during the Pristina Airport incident when Jackson refused the suggestion of his American NATO superior to confront Russian forces. Jarvis later described Jackson's comment to Wesley Clark that he was "not going to start World War Three for you" as a "very surreal moment in my life". Jarvis then served as Jackson's personal staff officer. In 2000 he was deployed to Sierra Leone in the aftermath of Operation Barras to help the army learn the lessons of the kidnap of a group of troops by an armed rebel group.

Jarvis served in Iraq during Operation Telic and in Afghanistan during Operation Herrick. He was deployed to Afghanistan twice, first as a member of the team making the first reconnaissance trips to Helmand Province in 2005 to 2006, in preparation for a decision on whether to commit British troops there. The second deployment was a six-month tour as a company commander with the Special Forces Support Group, leading a company of 100 troops. He was also deployed to Northern Ireland.

He resigned his commission on 3 March 2011. In the 2011 Queen's Birthday Honours he was made a Member of the Order of the British Empire (Military division).

Early political career
Although his military service had precluded political activity, Jarvis had joined the Labour Party at the age of 18 while at university. Shortly before the 2010 general election, Jarvis was shortlisted for the Labour Party selection in the South Wales seat of Islwyn. He picked up support from one local would-be candidate who had not made the shortlist, but he was not selected.

Jarvis was selected as the Labour candidate for Barnsley Central on 27 January 2011, following the resignation of Eric Illsley who stood down after being convicted of fraud for his part in the United Kingdom parliamentary expenses scandal. An eliminating ballot was held and at the penultimate stage Jarvis was tied with local councillor Linda Burgess, each several votes behind Richard Burgon. London Regional Director, Ken Clark, put two pieces of paper into the hat of Phil Dilks, the Press Officer: one that read "Loser" and one "Winner". Burgess, in going first, picked out the paper reading "Loser", and Jarvis won. In the final stage he picked up most of Burgess' votes, and won selection. He became the first Labour candidate for the Barnsley Central seat since 1938 who was not born in Yorkshire.

On his selection, he resigned his commission in order to stand in the by-election; he gave his campaign the codename 'Operation Honey Badger', referring to a famously fierce animal and signifying his determination to fight for the people of Barnsley. Jarvis found that his Nottingham origins put off some Barnsley voters, who remembered the fact that Nottinghamshire miners did not join the 1984–85 miners' strike, although he had been 12 at the time.

Parliamentary career

He was elected for Barnsley Central with a 60.8% share of the vote on a turnout of 36.5% in the by-election held on 3 March 2011.

During his maiden speech on the 2011 budget, Jarvis called for a change in economic policy including "a plan to get jobs and to help families feeling the squeeze". He also referred to Parachute Regiment colleagues who had been killed in action and argued that the UK and US should put forward reconciliation in Afghanistan. He joined the Business, Innovation and Skills Select Committee on 21 March. Jarvis spoke in a debate about NHS reforms in May 2011, paying emotional tribute to the doctors and nurses who cared for his wife, who had died the previous year, and feared an "ideological free-market agenda" which he said would undermine "all that is great about the NHS".

In October 2011, Jarvis was appointed shadow arts minister, part of the shadow culture, media and sport team led by Harriet Harman; he moved to become shadow youth justice and victims minister in Labour leader Ed Miliband's October 2013 shadow cabinet reshuffle.

Following the Labour Party's defeat in the 2015 general election, and the resignation of Ed Miliband, media speculation about candidates for the party's leadership election included Dan Jarvis alongside several other MPs. However, he quickly announced that he was not going to run, saying that he needed to put his young family first; he had recently remarried after losing his first wife to cancer.

Jarvis voted along with 66 other Labour MPs for military action in Syria against ISIL in December 2015, arguing that the decision was "finely balanced" but that he did not believe the UK could pursue existing operations against ISIS without being able to attack ISIS's command centres on the other side of the Syrian border. He had previously opposed military action against the Assad regime in Syria in 2013.

Jarvis campaigned for a remain vote in the European Union membership referendum, whilst his constituency was heavily in favour of Brexit. Jarvis voted to trigger Article 50, stating that the referendum result and his own constituents' views must be respected rather than ignored.

Mayoralty
Jarvis was elected Mayor of the Sheffield City Region in 2018. Upon taking office, he became entitled to the style of Mayor. On 20 September 2021 he announced he would not be standing for re-election at the 2022 South Yorkshire mayoral election. He will remain an MP.

Personal life
Jarvis met his first wife, Caroline, in 2000, when she was working as a personal chef for the family of General Sir Mike Jackson. Their first child was born in 2003, three days before Jarvis was deployed to Iraq; their second child was born in 2004. Caroline Jarvis was diagnosed with bowel cancer in 2006; she died at the age of 43 in July 2010. In 2013 Jarvis married a freelance graphic designer, Rachel Jarvis, and the couple had a child.
Jarvis is also an author with his memoir, A Long Way Home, first published in 2020. The book chronicles his time in the British Army and he dealt with the diagnosis and untimely death of Caroline Jarvis. In 2020, the book was named Best Memoir at the Parliamentary Book Awards 2020.

Honours

References

External links

 
2011 by-election at OurCampaigns.com

1972 births
Living people
20th-century British Army personnel
21st-century British Army personnel
Alumni of Aberystwyth University
Alumni of King's College London
British Army personnel of the Iraq War
British Army personnel of the War in Afghanistan (2001–2021)
British Parachute Regiment officers
Graduates of the Royal Military Academy Sandhurst
Graduates of the Joint Services Command and Staff College
Labour Party (UK) MPs for English constituencies
Labour Friends of Israel
Mayors of places in Yorkshire and the Humber
Members of the Order of the British Empire
Politicians from Nottingham
UK MPs 2010–2015
UK MPs 2015–2017
UK MPs 2017–2019
UK MPs 2019–present
Military personnel from Nottingham